The Eleventh-Hour Shine-On is an album by the free jazz ensemble Universal Congress Of. It was released in 1992 through Enemy Records. "Broad Way Blues" is a cover of the Ornette Coleman song.

Critical reception

The Los Angeles Times wrote: "Their rough, occasionally ragged style is tempered by an awareness of their limitations, the tart blend of Joe Baiza's guitar and Steve Moss' tenor, and a particular flair for slow grooves such as 'Gaetasaurus'."

Track listing

Personnel 

Universal Congress Of
Joe Baiza – guitar, vocals, production, illustrations
Steve Gaeta – bass guitar
A.P. Gonzalez – drums
Steve Moss – tenor saxophone, vocals and harp on "Mud Man Blues"

Additional musicians and production
Thomas Brick – mastering
Rick Cox – tenor saxophone
Danny Frankel – percussion
David Gaeta – congas on "Gaetasaurus" and "Full-Bodied Naked Hug"
Konan Kelley – engineering
Michael Knuth – production
Martin Lyon – photography
Vitus Mataré – production, mixing
Paul S. Uriaz Jr. – illustrations

References 

Universal Congress Of albums
1992 albums
Enemy Records albums